Reem Saleh Al Gurg (Arabic: ريم صالح القرق) is the author of children's stories from the United Arab Emirates. She was excellent in communicating with the younger generation. She's the first Arab woman to enter the Guinness World Records for creating the largest mosaic panel in the world. Reem managed to put her name on the front pages of the Guinness World Records Arabic edition for the year 2009, through a wooden mosaic panel called "Desert Vision."

Her beginning 
The author's daughter played a major role in her getting into the children's stories. Reem was looking for a gift that her daughter deserves, and there is nothing better than giving her a kids stories that are useful enough, Under virtue of intermittent living in London of course she does not want the English language, because it's an easy language to acquire and learn.

Reem searched for compelling Arabic stories and did not find anything to fulfill her curiosity in substance, form, and attractive images, so she took it upon herself to accomplish the goal. Reem sat and thought then she inspired her national story "Wid and Walid," from the longing for the homeland. This was the first story she gave as a gift to her daughter, and soon this story turned into a series of stories.

This story is about two children on the National Day roaming the seven Emirates and realizing many beautiful and expressive facts. This series issued in collaboration with the Mohammed bin Rashid Al Maktoum Knowledge Foundation. Her presence in Britain for study prompted her to accomplish more meaningful work for her daughter and other youngsters, especially as she lives in a state of permanent nostalgia for her homeland, which motivates her towards expression from the depths of her feeling.

Education 

 Bachelor of Science in Medical Laboratory Sciences, University of Sharjah, 2004.
 Master's degree in Nutrition from King's College, Britain.
 Ph.D. in Health Policy and Management from Bradford University.

Position 

 Director of Strategy & Corporate Excellence and Assistant Professor of Health Policy at Mohammed Bin Rashid University Of Medicine and Health Sciences.
 Member of the Emirates Scientists Council.

Literature

Private life 
She is married and has two daughters named Wid and Haya.

References 

Arab novelists
Arab women
Arab writers
Emirati women
Year of birth missing (living people)
Living people